Madison Brengle and Asia Muhammed were the defending champions, but Muhammed chose not to participate. Brengle partnered up with Amanda McDowell, but lost in the first round to Gail Brodsky and Alyona Sotnikova. 
Elena Bovina and Valeria Savinykh won the title by defeating Varvara Lepchenko and Mashona Washington in the final 7–6(8–6), 6–3.

Seeds

Draw

Draw

References
 Main Draw

USTA Tennis Classic of Troy - Doubles
USTA Tennis